Myelobia decolorata is a moth in the family Crambidae. It is found in Colombia, Venezuela and Brazil.

References

Chiloini